Gevorg Jahukyan (1920-2005) was an Armenian linguist and philologist, Doctor of Philological Sciences, Professor, Academician of the Academy of Sciences of Armenia, Honored Scientist of the Armenian SSR.

Biography
 
He was born on April 1, 1920, in the village of Shahnazar (now Metsavan) in the present-day Lori Province of Armenia. In 1941 he graduated from Yerevan State University Faculty of Philology. From 1941 to 1943 he participated in the WWII.

In 1945 - 1949 he was a senior lecturer at YSU Faculty of Philology, from 1948 to 1957 he was the Head of the Department of Foreign Languages, from 1957 to 1970 he was the Head of the Chair of Romance and Germanic Philology, from 1970 he was the Professor of the Chair of General Linguistics, from 1962 to the end of his life he was the Director of the Acharian Institute of Language and Chairman of the Professional Council of Linguistics of the Academy of Sciences of the Armenian SSR. His two-volume “History of Linguistics” (Yerevan, 1960 - 1962, 2015) and “General and Armenian Linguistics” (Yerevan, 1978) led to the idea of creating a common language model, which was implemented in the monograph “General Theory of Language” (Russian, Moscow, 1999, English, 2003). In 1988 he was awarded the State Prize of the Armenian SSR. He died on July 8, 2005, in Yerevan. His bronze bust is placed in the lobby of YSU Main Building, one of the classrooms of the Faculty of Armenian Philology is named after him.

References

1920 births
2005 deaths
People from Lori Province
Linguists from Armenia
Armenian philologists
Academic staff of Yerevan State University
Soviet Armenians
20th-century linguists
20th-century philologists
Soviet philologists